is a Japanese adult game and visual novel brand used by TGL subsidiary Entergram. The Giga brand is used on both regular visual novels as well as games that feature mecha with action-oriented gameplay elements. One of its sub-brands, Baldrhead, has been used for several of these action-oriented visual novels. Aside from their visual novels, they are known for creating the Variable Geo fighting game series for PC9800, which was later ported to TurboGrafx-CD, PC, Super Famicom, Sega Saturn and PlayStation.

Some of Giga's games have had consumer port releases onto consoles with the sexual content removed. For example, Kono Aozora ni Yakusoku o was ported to the PlayStation 2 in 2007 and the PlayStation Portable in 2009. Baldr Force was ported to the Dreamcast and PlayStation 2 and Baldr Bullet "Revellion" was ported to the PlayStation 2.

Kono Aozora ni Yakusoku o was very well received and was awarded the Bishōjo Game Award gold prize in the scenario, theme song, romance, and user approval categories in addition to the grand prize in 2006. Baldr Sky Dive1 "Lost Memories" was awarded the Moe Game Award silver prize in the theme song category in 2009.

Giga announced that they will go out of business on March 31, 2023.

Sub-Brands
Armonica (defunct)
Daisy
Exa
Fermi
Nata de Koko
Pizzicato
RondoBell
Sky-High
Stripe
TEAM BALDRHEAD (developers of the Baldr series)

Games
PC-9800 series/Windows (1993-1996)

Windows (1998–present)

References

External links
Official website 

Video game publishing brands
Japanese companies established in 1993
Video game companies established in 1993
Video game companies of Japan